Edmund Verney may refer to:

Sir Edmund Verney (Cavalier) (1590 or 1596–1642), English royalist, MP for Buckingham 1624, New Romney, Aylesbury and Wycombe
Sir Edmund Verney (soldier) (1616–1649), English soldier, son of the above
Sir Edmund Verney, 3rd Baronet (1838–1910), Royal Navy captain and British MP for Buckingham 1885–1886 and 1889–1891
Sir Edmund Verney, 6th Baronet (born 1950)